Slaheddine Fessi (born 15 November 1956) is a Tunisian former footballer who played as a goalkeeper. He competed in the men's tournament at the 1988 Summer Olympics.

Career
Fessi joined Club Africain in 1966, at the age of 10. For a while, he also played handball and volleyball. After being promoted to Club Africain's senior team, he was initially understudy to Sadok Sassi and Mokhtar Naili.

Fessi spent two seasons with German club FSV Frankfurt. Having been third-choice goalkeeper at the club, he made his debut in April 1980 in the 2. Bundesliga, replacing the injured Jürgen Grün in a 3–0 loss to SC Freiburg. He went on to make eight league appearances in the 1979–80 2. Bundesliga season. He left the club in summer 1980.

Fessi signed with Stade Gabèsien after his return from Germany.

References

1956 births
Living people
Tunisian footballers
Association football goalkeepers
Tunisia international footballers
Olympic footballers of Tunisia
Footballers at the 1988 Summer Olympics
2. Bundesliga players
Club Africain players
FSV Frankfurt players
Stade Gabèsien players
Tunisian expatriate footballers
Tunisian expatriate sportspeople in Germany
Expatriate footballers in Germany
Place of birth missing (living people)